Morina is a surname. Notable people with the surname include:

 Giulio Morina (1550–1609), Italian painter
 Henry E. Moreno (1930-2007), Kentucky Derby winning jockey
 Henry M. Moreno (born 1929), American racehorse trainer
 Mario Morina (born 1992), Albanian footballer 
 Rahman Morina (1943–1990), Yugoslav (Kosovan Albanian) police officer and political figure
 Sally Sussman Morina, American television soap opera writer and producer, wife of Anthony

Albanian-language surnames
Italian-language surnames